Signal transducer and activator of transcription 4 (STAT4) is a transcription factor belonging to the STAT protein family, composed of STAT1, STAT2, STAT3, STAT4, STAT5A, STAT5B, STAT6. STAT proteins are key activators of gene transcription which bind to DNA in response to cytokine gradient. STAT proteins are a common part of Janus kinase (JAK)- signalling pathways, activated by cytokines.STAT4 is required for the development of Th1 cells from naive CD4+ T cells and IFN-γ production in response to IL-12. There are two known STAT4 transcripts, STAT4α and STAT4β, differing in the levels of interferon-gamma (IFN-γ )production downstream.

Structure 

Human as well murine STAT4 genes lie next to  STAT1 gene locus suggesting that the genes arose by gene duplication. STAT proteins have six functional domains: 1. N-terminal interaction domain – crucial for dimerization of inactive STATs and nuclear translocation; 2.helical coiled coil domain –  association with regulatory factors; 3. central DNA-binding domain – binding to the enhancer region of IFN-γ activated sequence (GAS) family genes; 4. linker domain –  assisting during the DNA binding process; 5. Src homology 2  (SH2) domain – critical for specific binding to the cytokine receptor after tyrosine phosphorylation; 6. C-terminal transactivation domain – triggering the transcriptional process. The length of the protein is 748 amino acids, and the molecular weight is 85 941 Dalton.

Expression 

Distribution of STAT4 is restricted to myeloid cells, thymus and testis. In resting human T cells it is  expressed at very low levels, but its production is amplified by PHA stimulation.

Cytokines activating STAT4

IL-12 
Pro-inflammatory cytokine IL-12 is produced in heterodimer form by B cells and antigen-presenting cells. Binding of IL-12 to IL-12R, which is composed of two different subunits (IL12Rβ1 and IL12Rβ2), leads to the interaction of IL12Rβ1 and IL12Rβ2 with JAK2 and TYK2, which is followed by phosphorylation of STAT4 tyrosine 693. The pathway then induces IFNγ production and Th1 differentiation. STAT4 is critical in promotion of antiviral response of natural killer (NK) cell by targeting of promotor regions of Runx1 and Runx3.

IFNα and IFNβ 
Secreted by leukocytes, respectively fibroblasts, IFNα IFNβ together regulate antiviral immunity, cell proliferation and anti-tumor effects. In viral infection signalling pathway, either of IFNα or β binds to IFN receptor (IFNAR), composed of IFNAR1 and IFNAR2, immediately followed by the phosphorylation of STAT1, STAT4 and IFN target genes. During the initial phase of viral infection in NK cells, STAT1 activation is replaced by the activation of STAT4.

IL-23 

Monocytes, activated dendritic cells (DC) and macrophages stimulate the accumulation of IL-23 after exposure to molecules of Gram-positive/negative bacteria or viruses. Receptor for IL-23 contains IL12β1 and IL23R subunits, which upon binding of IL-23 promotes the phosphorylation STAT4. The presence of IL12β1 enables similar, although weaker downstream activity as compared to IL-12. During chronic inflammation, IL-23/STAT4 signalling pathway is involved in the induction of differentiation and expansion of Th17 pro-inflammatory T helper cells.

Additionally, other cytokines like IL2, IL 27, IL35, IL18 and IL21 are known to activate STAT4.

Inhibitors of STAT4 signalling pathways 
In cells with progressively increasing expression of IL12 and IL6, SOCSs production and activity suppress cytokine signalling and phosphorylation of JAK-STAT pathways in a negative feedback loop.

Other suppressors of the pathways are: protein inhibitor of activated STAT (PAIS) (regulation of transcriptional activity in the nucleus, observed in STAT4-DNA binding complex), protein tyrosine phosphatase (PTP) (removal of phosphate groups from phosphorylated tyrosine in JAK/STAT pathway proteins), STAT-interacting LIM protein (SLIM) (STAT ubiquitin E3 ligase blocking the phosphorylation of STAT4) or microRNA (miRNA) (degradation of STAT4 mRNA and its post-transcriptional regulation).

Target genes 

STAT4 binds to hundreds of sites in the genome, among others to the promoters of genes for cytokines (IFN-γ, TNF), receptors (IL18R1, IL12rβ2, IL18RAP), and signaling factors (MYD88).

Disease 
STAT4 is involved in several autoimmune and cancer diseases in animal models humans, significantly in the disease progression and pathology. STAT4 were significantly increased in patients with colitis ulcerative and skin T cells of psoriatic patients. Moreover, STAT4 -/- mice developed less severe experimental autoimmune encephalo-myelitis (EAE) than the wild type mice.

Intronic single nucleotide polymorphism (SNP)  mostly in third intron of the STAT4 has shown to be associated with immune dysregulation and autoimmunity including systemic lupus erythematosus (SLE)  and rheumatoid arthritis as well as Sjögren's disease (SD), systemic sclerosis, psoriasis and also type-1 diabetes. High incident of STAT4 genetic polymorphisms and susceptibility to autoimmune diseases is a reason to consider the STAT4 as  general autoimmune disease susceptibility locus.

References

Further reading

External links 
 

Gene expression
Immune system
Proteins
Transcription factors
Signal transduction